Helmut Lehmann is a former South African rugby union player, that played for  in the Currie Cup and Vodacom Cup. His usual position is flanker.

References

Living people
1990 births
South African rugby union players
Western Province (rugby union) players
Sportspeople from Paarl
Rugby union flankers
Alumni of Paarl Gimnasium
Rugby union players from the Western Cape